Rangpur  may refer to:

Places
Rangpur, Bangladesh, a city in Bangladesh
Rangpur District
Rangpur Division
Rangpur, Assam, a capital of the historic Ahom kingdom in present-day Assam, India
Rangpur, Gujarat, a historic site in Gujarat, India
Rangpur, Punjab, a town in Pakistan

Other uses
Rangpur (fruit), a type of citrus fruit

See also
 Rangapur (disambiguation)
 Ranpur (disambiguation)
 Rajbanshi (disambiguation)
 Rangpuri language, Indo-Aryan language spoken in India, Bangladesh, and Nepal